David Vogel may refer to:

David Vogel (author) (1891–1944), Russian-born Hebrew poet, novelist, and diarist
David Vogel (professor) (born 1949), professor of political science and business at UC Berkeley

See also
David Fogel (disambiguation)